The Diamond  is a 1954 British film noir crime film starring Dennis O'Keefe, Margaret Sheridan and Philip Friend. It is based on the 1952 novel Rich Is the Treasure by Maurice Procter. It was released by United Artists in both Britain and America where it was known as The Diamond Wizard. It has the distinction of being Britain's first 3D film, though according to the British Film Institute, it was shown in 3D only once, on 13 September 2006 in Hollywood. Despite the 2006 showing the film was listed on the BFI 75 Most Wanted list of lost films. The 2D film, however, is not lost and can be viewed on Amazon Prime while the restored 3D version was released on Blu-Ray November 2022.

Production 
It was shot at Walton Studios with location filming taking place around London. The film's sets were designed by the art director Denis Wreford. It was produced by the independent British company Gibraltar Films for release by United Artists. It was O'Keefe's second role in a British film having starred in another crime-thriller The Fake the previous year.

It seems unclear who directed The Diamond. According to the British Film Institute website the British release credited British B-picture veteran Montgomery Tully as director, while the US release credited the film's American star, Dennis O'Keefe. However, the US print viewed by the reviewer of the American Film Institute Catalog of Motion Pictures credits Tully while a YouTube video with the opening credits of a print bearing the British release title credits O'Keefe.

Plot 
After a gang pulls off a heist to acquire freshly minted dollars, American Treasury Agent Joe Dennison pursues their trail to London. With the assistance of a Scotland Yard detective, he attempts to break a racket involving the production of synthetic diamonds.

Cast

Dennis O'Keefe as Joe Dennison
Margaret Sheridan as Marline Miller
Philip Friend as Inspector McClaren
Alan Wheatley as Thompson Blake
Francis de Wolff as Yeo
Eric Berry as Hunziger
Michael Balfour as Hoxie
Gudrun Ure as Sergeant Smith 
Paul Hardtmuth as Dr. Eric Miller 
 Colin Tapley as	Sir Stafford Beach
Donald Gray as Commander Gilles
Cyril Chamberlain as Castle
Seymour Green as Lascelles
 Betty McDowall as 	Police Sgt. Graves
 Alastair Hunter as 	Dr. Cully 
 Paul Carpenter as 	Mickey Sweeney
 Philip Lennard	as	Police Sgt. Hunter 
 Victor Wood	as	Sam, Fingerprint Technician
 Molly Weir as 	Mrs. Sayer 
 Gordon McLeod as 	Paul Hawkins 
 Arthur Mullard as 	Police Informer
  Wensley Pithey as Police Sergeant

References

External links
British Film Institute 75 Most Wanted entry, with extensive notes

The Diamond at the BFI Database

1954 films
1954 3D films
Film noir
British 3D films
British crime films
1954 crime films
British black-and-white films
Films based on British novels
Films directed by Montgomery Tully
Films set in London
Films set in Minneapolis
Films shot in London
Films shot at Nettlefold Studios
United Artists films
1950s lost films
1950s English-language films
1950s British films